Barry T. Parker (born December 12, 1932) is an American Republican Party politician who served in both the New Jersey General Assembly and the New Jersey Senate.

Biography
Parker was born in Mount Holly Township, New Jersey in 1932 and graduated from the Bordentown Military Institute in 1950. He received his A.B. degree from Bucknell University in 1954 and his LL.B. degree from Rutgers University in 1960.

Parker was first elected to the General Assembly in 1965 and was reelected in 1967 and 1969. He was named Speaker of the Assembly in 1971. While serving as Speaker, he was elected to the State Senate. He was reelected in 1973 and 1977 and served as Minority Leader.

Parker did not seek reelection for his Senate seat in 1981, instead running for Governor of New Jersey. In a crowded field for the Republican primary, he garnered 7% of the vote, coming in fifth behind Thomas Kean (31%), Paterson Mayor Lawrence F. Kramer (21%), businessman Joseph A. Sullivan (17%), and State Senator James Wallwork.

Parker is of counsel at the law firm Parker, McCay in Marlton, New Jersey.

References

1932 births
Living people
Bordentown Military Institute alumni
Speakers of the New Jersey General Assembly
Republican Party members of the New Jersey General Assembly
Republican Party New Jersey state senators
People from Mount Holly, New Jersey
Bucknell University alumni
Rutgers University alumni